The  (CSJ) is a learned society and professional association founded in 1878 in order to advance research in chemistry.  The mission of the CSJ is to promote chemistry for science and industry in collaboration with other domestic and global societies.

History
The organization was modeled after the British Chemical Society.  This learned society in London was the precursor of the Royal Society of Chemistry. Like its British counterpart, the Japanese association sought to foster the communication of new ideas and facts throughout Japan and across international borders.   
 
Membership was expanded in 1948 in a merger with the Society of Chemical Industry. In 2018 the first woman was announced as president, the distinguished chemist Maki Kawai.

Activities
Support for the Bulletin of the Chemical Society of Japan (BCSJ) began in 1926.  Other publications of the society include:
 Bioscience, Biotechnology, and Biochemistry 
 Chemistry Letters

Annual Meeting 
The society holds an annual meeting in March, every year.  

 The 102nd CSJ Annual Meeting is held on March 23 to March 26, 2022 at the Nishinomiya Uegahara campus of Kwansei Gakuin University.
 The 101st CSJ Annual Meeting was virtually held on March 19 to March 21, 2021.

Chemistry & Chemical Industry 
The society publishes "Chemistry & Chemical Industry" every month in a printed form, which is sent to the members of the society.  The digital form of "Chemistry & Chemical Industry" is uploaded in the website of the society, and any member of the society can access the digital form.

See also
 List of chemistry societies
 Royal Society of Chemistry, 1841 
 Société Chimique de France, 1857 
 Deutsch Chemische Gesellschaft, 1867 
 American Chemical Society, 1876 
 Japan Association for International Chemical Information, 1971

Notes

External links
 

 
Scientific organizations established in 1878
Scientific organizations based in Japan
Chemistry societies
Chemistry education
1878 establishments in Japan